This is a list of films which placed number-one at the weekend box office in Brazil during 2020.

References

2020 in Brazil
2020
Brazil